Iodine trichloride is an interhalogen compound of iodine and chlorine. It is bright yellow but upon time and exposure to light it turns red due to the presence of elemental iodine. In the solid state is present as a planar dimer I2Cl6, with two bridging Cl atoms.

It can be prepared by reacting iodine with an excess of liquid chlorine at −70 °C. In the molten state it is conductive, which may indicate dissociation:

I2Cl6   + 

Iodine trichloride can be created by heating a mixture of liquid iodine and chlorine gas to 105 °C.

It is an oxidizing agent, capable of causing fire on contact with organic materials.

References

Iodine compounds
Chlorides
Interhalogen compounds
Oxidizing agents